is a city located in Chiba Prefecture, Japan. , the city had an estimated population of  57,780 in 26,907 households and a population density of 650 persons per km².

Tōgane is home to the Kurenai-kai School of Japanese embroidery, which produces handmade obi and kimono in the traditional Japanese style.

Geography
Tōgane is located in center-eastern Chiba Prefecture at the border of the Bōsō Hill Range. It is approximately 25 kilometers from the prefectural capital at Chiba and 50 to 60 kilometers from downtown Tokyo. The city has a number of large exclave surrounded by the city of Sanmu, and Sanmu likewise has two enclaves within with borders of the Tōgane exclave.

Surrounding municipalities
Chiba Prefecture
Midori-ku, Chiba
Wakaba-ku, Chiba
Sanmu
Yachimata
Ōamishirasato
Kujūkuri

Climate
Tōgane has a humid subtropical climate (Köppen Cfa) characterized by warm summers and cool winters with light to no snowfall.  The average annual temperature in Tōgane is 14.9 °C. The average annual rainfall is 1575 mm with September as the wettest month. The temperatures are highest on average in August, at around 25.9 °C, and lowest in January, at around 4.9 °C.

Demographics
Per Japanese census data, the population of Tōgane has recently plateaued after several decades of growth.

History

During the Edo Period, Tōgane was the location of a villa on Lake Hakkaku used by the Shogun Tokugawa Ieyasu and Tokugawa Hidetada for falconry. The town of Tōgane was founded on April 1, 1889 as part of Sanbe District, Chiba Prefecture with the establishment of the modern municipalities system. Sanbe District became Sanbu District on April 1, 1897. The town expanded on April 1, 1953 through annexation of the neighboring villages of Okayama, Masaki, Toyonari, Kohei and a portion of the village of Yamato. It was elevated to city status on April 1, 1954 after further expansion through annexation of parts of the neighboring villages of Hara and Fukuoka.

Government
Tōgane has a mayor-council form of government with a directly elected mayor and a unicameral city council of 22 members. Tōgane contributes one member to the Chiba Prefectural Assembly. In terms of national politics, the city is part of Chiba 11th district of the lower house of the Diet of Japan.

Economy
Tōgane is known for strawberry picking in February and March. Strawberries are grown in greenhouses.  Because there is not much industry remaining in some rural areas of Japan like Tōgane, antique markets are gaining popularity as old farmhouses are torn down.

Education
Josai International University
Tōgane has nine public elementary schools and four public middle schools operated by the city government, and two public high schools operated by the Chiba Prefectural Board of Education. There is also one private high school. The prefecture also operates one special education school for the handicapped.

Transportation

Railway
 JR East –  Tōgane Line
 -  -

Highway

Sister city relations
 - Rueil-Malmaison, France from November 7, 1970

Noted people from Tōgane 
Yuji Nagata, professional wrestler
Katsuhiko Nagata, Olympic silver medalist in wrestling
Urara Takano, voice actress

References

External links

Official Website 

 
Cities in Chiba Prefecture